George Anderson (1677–1756) was a prominent Scottish minister during the Enlightenment. He is principally remembered for being the prime sponsor of a motion to excommunicate David Hume and Lord Kames in church courts. He also wrote several rebuttals to what he perceived as radical in Hume's writings.

References

1677 births
1756 deaths
18th-century Ministers of the Church of Scotland
People of the Scottish Enlightenment